USS Lorikeet may refer to the following ships of the United States Navy:

 , was a coastal minesweeper commissioned 8 August 1941 and decommissioned 14 December 1945
 , was launched 17 October 1942 as YMS-271, renamed and reclassified as Lorikeet (AMS‑49) 1 September 1947 and struck 1 October 1968

United States Navy ship names